Will Brandenburg (born January 1, 1987) is a World Cup alpine ski racer on the U.S. Ski Team and specializes in slalom.

Born in Walla Walla, Washington, Brandenburg began skiing at 11 months and started racing at age seven at Ski Bluewood near Dayton. He moved with his family to Spokane as a youth, then raced with the Spokane Ski Racing Association at Mt. Spokane, and later at Schweitzer Mountain near Sandpoint in nearby northern Idaho.  A 2005 graduate of Mead High School in Spokane, he also played high school football for the Panthers, with a brief stint at quarterback.

Brandenburg was named to the U.S. development team in May 2006. At the 2007 U.S. Alpine Championships in April, he placed second in the giant slalom in at Alyeska, won by Ted Ligety. A day earlier, Brandenburg was named U.S. junior alpine ski racer of the year by Ski Racing magazine.

Brandenburg was named to the U.S. team for the 2010 Winter Olympics, and finished tenth in super combined event, won by Bode Miller, and had the second best time in its slalom run, behind Ligety. He was also a member of the U.S. team for the 2011 World Championships and raced in the slalom.

Brandenburg's best World Cup finish is sixth place in a slalom at Kranjska Gora in March 2012.

He won the combined event at the 2013 U.S. Alpine Championships at Squaw Valley.

World Cup top 30 finishes

World Championship results

Olympic results

References

External links
 
 Will Brandenburg World Cup standings at the International Ski Federation
 
 
 U.S. Ski Team – profile – Will Brandenburg
 Fischer Skis – athletes – alpine skiing – Will Brandenburg
 willbrandenburgusa.com – personal site

Alpine skiers at the 2010 Winter Olympics
American male alpine skiers
Olympic alpine skiers of the United States
1987 births
Living people
People from Walla Walla, Washington